The 1970 Washington Star International was a men's tennis tournament and was played on outdoor clay courts. It was the second edition of the tournament and was part of the 1970 Grand Prix circuit and categorized as a Class 2 event. It was held  at the Rock Creek Park in Washington, D.C. from July 13 through July 19, 1970. Cliff Richey won the singles title and earned a $7,000 first prize.

Finals

Singles
 Cliff Richey defeated  Arthur Ashe 7–5, 6–2, 6–1

Doubles
 Bob Hewitt/  Frew McMillan defeated  Ilie Năstase /  Ion Țiriac 7–5, 6–0

References

External links
 ATP tournament profile
 ITF tournament edition details

Washington Open (tennis)
Washington Star International
Washington Star International
Washington Star International
Tennis tournaments in Washington, D.C.
Washington Star International